Mönchengladbach Airport (formerly Düsseldorf Mönchengladbach Airport) is a small regional airport located  northeast of Mönchengladbach and  west of Düsseldorf. It is co-owned by the company which also runs Düsseldorf Airport (70%) and the local utility company NVV AG (30%).

History
The British Army of the Rhine undertook an exercise in 1955, in accord with the then NATO-Strategy of quick reaction. They built a basic 'field-made' airfield on the grass-covered area for an air-landing-exercise on this site. On finishing this exercise, the British Army of the Rhine handed the area over to the Mayor of Mönchengladbach for use as an airfield. The airfield was taken into service as a small airstrip for gliders. A hangar was built in 1957, and the next year a control tower and passenger terminal were constructed. The construction of the  runway that is still used today began in 1970, and it was completed in 1973.

From 1996 until 2002, the Belgian airline VLM operated direct services to London City Airport with Fokker 50 aeroplanes providing up to 24 weekly flights in each direction. From 1996 to 1999, the British Airline Debonair operated services to London Luton Airport, and when Debonair was put into administration, the services were taken over by European Air Express who also operated services to Munich and Sylt/Westerland until the airline ceased operations in 2007.

In 2016, the airport underwent a rebranding and changed its name from Düsseldorf Mönchengladbach Airport to just Mönchengladbach Airport and also changed its corporate design to match the new one of its majority shareholder Düsseldorf Airport.

Airlines and destinations
There are currently no scheduled services to and from Mönchengladbach. The airport is dominated by general aviation. Additionally, there are few business-charter passenger flights.

See also
 Transport in Germany
 List of airports in Germany

References

 Development Association Airport Mönchengladbach
Statement by the German green party
Air Berlin BAe146-200 departing from runway 13
This article is a translation of the German language article "Flughafen Düsseldorf-Mönchengladbach" in the German Wikipedia. (as it was on February 19, 2005)

External links

 Official website
 
 

Mönch
Airports established in 1955
Buildings and structures in North Rhine-Westphalia
Airport
1955 establishments in West Germany